Vaginal tumors are neoplasms (tumors) found in the vagina. They can be benign or malignant. A neoplasm is an abnormal growth of tissue that usually forms a tissue mass.
Vaginal neoplasms may be solid, cystic or of mixed type.

Vaginal cancers arise from vaginal tissue, with vaginal sarcomas develop from bone, cartilage, fat, muscle, blood vessels or other connective or supportive tissue. Tumors in the vagina may also be metastases (malignant tissue that has spread to the vagina from other parts of the body).
 Cancer that has spread from the colon, bladder, and stomach is far more common than cancer that originates in the vagina itself. Some benign tumors may later progress to become malignant tumors, such as vaginal cancers.
Some neoplastic growths of the vagina are sufficiently rare as to be only described in case studies.

Signs and symptoms may include a feeling of pressure, painful intercourse or bleeding. Most vaginal tumors are located during a pelvic exam. Ultrasonography, CT and MRI imaging is used to establish the location and presence or absence of fluid in a tumor. Biopsy provides a more definitive diagnosis.

Vaginal tumors 

{| class="wikitable sortable"
|+
!Vaginal tumors
!Benign 
!Synonyms and notes
!References
|-
|Yolk sac tumor
|no
|Endodermal sinus tumor
|
|-
|Peripheral primitive neuroectodermal tumor
|no
|Ewing's sarcoma 
|
|-
|Vaginal melanoma
|no
|Melanocytic tumor
|
|-
|Blue nevus
|yes
|Melanocytic tumor, blue mole, nevus bleu, 
melancytic nevus
|
|-
|Carcinosarcoma
|no
|Malignant Mullerian Mixed tumors;
metaplastic carcinoma
|
|-
|Sarcoma botryoides
|no
|botryoid sarcoma, botryoid rhabdomyosarcoma; 
subtype of embryonal rhabdomyosarcoma
|
|-
|Leimyosarcoma
|no
|localized tumor of leukemic cells
|
|-
|Endometrioid stromal sarcoma
|no
|endometrial stromal sarcoma
|
|-
|Undifferentiated vaginal sarcoma
|
|
|
|-
|Leiomyoma
|yes
|fibromyoma
|
|-
|Genital rhabdomyoma
|
|
|
|-
|Deep angiomyoxoma
|
|
|
|-
|Spindle cell nodule
|
|Vaginal Solitary Fibrous Tumor
|
|-
|Undifferentiated carcinoma
|
|
|
|-
|Small cell carcinoma
|no
|
|
|-
|Carcinoid
|no
|
|
|-
|Adenoid basal carcinoma
|
|
|
|-
|Adenosquamous carcinoma
|no
|
|
|-
|Adenoma
|yes
|
|
|-
|Mucinous adenocarcinoma
|
|
|
|-
|Squamous papilloma 
|yes
|vaginal micropapillomatosis
|
|-
|Endometrioid adenocarcinoma
|no
|
|
|-
|Mesonephric adenocarcinoma
|
|
|
|-
|Clear cell adenocarcinoma
|no
|
|
|-
|Fibroepithelial polyp
|yes
|
|
|-
|Squamous intraepithelial neoplasia
|
|
|
|-
|Genital wart
|yes
|Condylomata acuminata
|
|-
|Squamous cell carcinoma
|no
|Keratinizing, Nonkeratininzing, Basalaoid,
Verrucous, Warty
|
|-
|Mesenchymal tumors
|
|
|
|-
|Alveolar soft part sarcoma
|
|
|
|-
|Mixed epithelial and mesenchymal Tumors
|
|
|
|-
|Malignant mixed Tumors resembling synovial sarcoma
|
|
|
|-
|Benign mixed tumors
|
|
|
|-
|Adenomatoid Tumor
|yes
|
|
|-
|Malignant lymphoma
|no
|
|
|-
|Granulocytic sarcoma
|
|
|
|-
|Fibroepithelial polyp
|yes
|
|
|-
|Verrucous carcinoma
|no
|
|
|-
|Squamotransitional cell carcinoma
|
|
|
|}

Other animals 
Vaginal tumors also can be found in domesticated animals:
 Sarcoma botryoides
 Squamous cell carcinoma
 Condyloma acuminatum
 Squamous intraepithelial neoplasia
 Fibroepithelial polyp
 Clear-cell adenocarcinoma
 Squamous papilloma
 Leiomyoma
 Blue nevus
 Malignant melanoma
 Primitive neuroectodermal tumor
 Yolk sac tumor

See also 
 Urethral caruncle
 Vaginal cysts
 Vaginal intraepithelial neoplasia

Notes

References

External links 

Vagina, Anatomical Atlases, an Anatomical Digital Library (2018)

Human female reproductive system
Women and sexuality
Women's health
Anatomy
Gynaecology
Epithelium
Gynaecological cancer
Papillomavirus-associated diseases
Oncology
Types of animal cancers
Epidermal nevi, neoplasms, and cysts